There Will Be Violence is the third studio album by American Christian deathcore band Impending Doom and was released worldwide on July 20, 2010, via Facedown Records. It is the first with drummer Brandon Trahan, formerly of xDeathstarx. Trahan was asked by former bandmate Cory Johnson to join Impending Doom after drummer Isaac Bueno left the band prior to the recording of the album. It also the first album not to feature founding member Manny Contreras on guitar, although he is credited with writing some of material on the record.

Critical reception

The album received limited but generally positive reviews, despite the mixed to negative reception from fans. Of the reviews collected, the NewReview gave the album a perfect 5 out of 5 and stated: "Impending Doom has found their niche in the metal market by skillfully balancing brutality and finesse. They have taken the lessons learned from previous albums and evolved into the band they were always meant to be."

Track listing

Personnel
Impending Doom
 Brook Reeves – vocals, vocal production
 Cory Johnson – guitars, engineering
 David Sittig – bass
 Brandon Trahan – drums

Additional musicians
 Tim Lambesis – guest vocals on "Orphans", vocal production
 Vincent Bennett – guest vocals on "The Great Fear"

Additional personnel
 Daniel Castleman – production, engineering, mixing
 Alan Douches – mastering
 Khalil Rountree – sampling
 Alex Camarena – drum engineering
 Shawn Carrano – management
 Cody Delong – booking
 Mike Milford – artwork

References

2010 albums
Impending Doom albums
Facedown Records albums